The International Luxury Hotel Association (ILHA) is a nonprofit organization whose purpose is unifying and advancing the luxury hospitality industry. The association is the luxury hotel industry's influencer that reaches hotel and travel professionals through its media channels and publications.  It brings together industry experts and thought leaders to answer the greatest challenges facing the luxury hotel business today.

History
The International Luxury Hotel Association started in 2008 as  Luxury Hoteliers established by a group of 50 global luxury hotel executives and headed up by its current President Barak Hirschowitz. At that time, their purpose was to share best practices despite often being in competition with one another.  It was all about transparency and keeping pace with the changing needs of  luxury hotel guests. Few years after, due to the growth of the membership, it was re-established in Florida as a non-profit organization with the name International Luxury Hotel Association.

Each fall, the ILHA holds its annual INSPIRE conference.  INSPIRE 2019 was held at the Four Seasons Hotel in Miami.  The INSPIRE 2020 event was held virtually and 3000+ attendees.  It brought together owners, operators, developers, tech providers, investors and hotel brands to explore the latest trends and date in luxury travel.

Partnerships and services
The International Luxury Hotel Association brings together luxury hotel experts, travel companies, industry professionals, governments and educators with the common goal of improving standards in service and design in the luxury segment of the hotel industry. The ILHA achieves these goals by organizing annual Luxury Hotel Conference, publishing its  bimonthly premier magazine  tagged Luxury Hotelier, and providing other resources for education, training,  and networking to its members.

The ILHA has established a partnership with TrustYou; an online reputation management company, to produce the North America Guest Experience Awards. In 2015 it also established a partnership with PR Newswire to help the outfit distribute its content to the hospitality industry and also enhance the luxury hotel enterprise.

See also

 The Leading Hotels of the World
 International Hotel & Restaurant Association

References

External links
 

Organizations based in Palm Beach County, Florida
Hospitality industry organizations
Non-profit organizations based in Florida
Organizations established in 2008